Museum of Transport can refer to:
Glasgow Museum of Transport
Birmingham and Midland Museum of Transport
National Museum of Transportation, St. Louis, Missouri
Museum of Transport in Manchester, UK

See also:
List of transport museums